James Beale may refer to:

James M. H. Beale (1786–1866), U.S. Representative from Virginia
James Beale (athlete) (1881–?), track and field athlete
Africanus Horton (1835–1883), also known as James Beale, writer and folklorist from Sierra Leone

See also
James Beall (disambiguation)